The Adventures of a Two-Minute Werewolf, also called The Adventures of a 2-Minute Werewolf is a 1985 television film produced by ABC television as part of its ABC Weekend Special series. It is based on the young adult novel of the same name by Gene DeWeese.

Plot
Adolescent werewolf Walt Cribbens finds himself transforming into a wolf-boy form for two minutes at a time. He has no idea why he is a werewolf, so he decides to seek answers with the help of his best friend Cindy, who witnessed his very first transformation. This quest is complicated by a series of local robberies that throw suspicion on Walt.

External links
The Adventures of a Two-Minute Werewolf at the IMDB

Television about werewolves
ABC Weekend Special
1985 television films
1985 films
American television films
1985 fantasy films